Kwame "KJ" Evans Jr. is an American basketball player who attends Montverde Academy in Montverde, Florida. He is a consensus five-star basketball recruit and one of the top players in the 2023 class. He is committed to play basketball for the University of Oregon.

High school career
Evans attends Montverde Academy in Montverde, Florida. He transferred to Montverde from Baltimore Polytechnic Institute after his sophomore year. During his junior year, he helped lead Montverde to its second straight GEICO Nationals title and the school's third consecutive national championship overall, where he averaged 8 points and 6 rebounds over three games in the postseason.  On January 24, 2023, Evans was selected as a McDonald's All-American.

Recruiting
Evans is a consensus five-star recruit and one of the top players in the 2023 class, according to major recruiting services. On August 22, 2022, he committed to playing college basketball for Oregon over offers from Arizona, Auburn and Kentucky.

References

Living people
Power forwards (basketball)
Year of birth missing (living people)
American men's basketball players